Rémy Vincent Andrianjanaka (born October 6, 1952 in Ampasinambo) is a Malagasy politician.  A former member of the Senate of Madagascar for Vatovavy Fitovinany, he is a member of the Tiako I Madagasikara party.  As of 2019, he was head of the Vatovavy Fitovinany region.

References

1952 births
Living people
Members of the Senate (Madagascar)
People from Vatovavy-Fitovinany
Tiako I Madagasikara politicians